Callistachys is a genus of flowering plants in the legume family, Fabaceae. It belongs to the subfamily Faboideae.

Species
Callistachys comprises the following species:
 Callistachys aciculifera (Benth.) Kuntze

 Callistachys cordifolia (Andrews) Kuntze

 Callistachys hamulosa (Benth. ex A. Gray) Kuntze
 Callistachys lanceolata Vent.
 Callistachys microphylla (Benth.) Kuntze
 Callistachys procumbens (F. Muell.) Kuntze

Species names with uncertain taxonomic status
The status of the following species is unresolved:
 Callistachys ilicifolia Kuntze
 Callistachys linariaefolia G. Don
 Callistachys longifolia Paxton
 Callistachys pulteneae Kuntze
 Callistachys purpurea Van Houtte ex Heynh.
 Callistachys scandens Kuntze
 Callistachys sparsa A.Cunn. ex Benth.
 Callistachys staurophylla Kuntze
 Callistachys tricuspidata Kuntze

References

Mirbelioids
Fabaceae genera